Babičky dobíjejte přesně!  is a 1984 Czechoslovak comedy science fiction film directed by Ladislav Rychman.

Cast
 Jiří Lábus - Mr. Louda
 Daniela Kolářová - Mrs. Loudová (as Dana Kolárová)
 Libuše Havelková - Róza 350 GLS
 Jana Dítětová - Carmen - robotic grandmother
 Katka Urbancová - Alenka Loudová
 Piotr Frolik - Bertík Louda
 Antonín Hardt - Mr. Pálek
 Marie Málková - Mrs. Pálková
 Michal Rynes - Adam
 Dana Balounová - Sreinerová
 Viktor Vrabec - Operative of the fy BIOTEX
 Karel Chromík - Head of the fy BIOTEX
 Jarmila Smejkalová - Grandmother Loudová

External links
 

1980s science fiction comedy films
1984 films
Czechoslovak science fiction comedy films
Czech science fiction comedy films
1984 comedy films
1980s Czech-language films
1980s Czech films